Kokush (Käküş) is a rural locality (a village) in Nizhnekachmashevsky Selsoviet, Kaltasinsky District, Bashkortostan, Russia. The population was 284 as of 2010. There are 7 streets.

Geography 
Kokush is located 9 km northwest of Kaltasy (the district's administrative centre) by road. Nizhny Kachmash is the nearest rural locality.

References 

Rural localities in Kaltasinsky District